The Duratón River is a river in Spain, a tributary of the Douro. It originates in the municipality of Somosierra in the Sierra de Guadarrama.

References 

Rivers of Spain
Rivers of Castile and León
Tributaries of the Douro River